Cristian Ignat (born 29 January 2003), is a Romanian professional footballer who plays as a centre-back for Liga I club Rapid București.

Club career
Ignat made his Liga I debut on 14 December 2022 for Rapid București in a match against Petrolul Ploiești.

Career statistics

Club

References

External links
 
 

2003 births
Living people
Moldovan emigrants to Romania
Moldovan people of Romanian descent
Footballers from Chișinău
Moldovan footballers
Romanian footballers
Association football defenders
Moldova youth international footballers
Romania youth international footballers
Liga II players
Liga I players
FC Rapid București players
FC Unirea Constanța players
Moldovan expatriate footballers
Moldovan expatriate sportspeople in Romania